This is a list of the concerts or other musical events held at Parken Stadium in Copenhagen, Denmark.

(To sort the table by any column, click on the  icon next to the column title.)

References

External links
 Kunstnere i PARKEN at PARKEN.dk (in Danish language)
 Events at PARKEN.dk (in Danish language)

Lists of concerts and performances by location
Culture in Copenhagen
Danish music
Concerts at Parken Stadium
Lists of events by venue
Lists of events in Denmark
Entertainment events in Denmark